Storer v. Brown, 415 U.S. 724 (1974), was a case in which the Supreme Court of the United States upheld a California law that prohibited an individual from running for an elected office as an independent candidate if they were registered with a political party within the 12 months prior to the primary election.

See also
 List of United States Supreme Court cases, volume 415

External links
 

United States Supreme Court cases
1974 in United States case law
United States elections case law
United States Supreme Court cases of the Burger Court